The Upper Athabasca Region is a land-use framework region in northern Alberta, Canada. One of seven in the province, each is intended to develop and implement a regional plan, complementing the planning efforts of member municipalities in order to coordinate future growth. Corresponding roughly to major watersheds while following municipal boundaries, these regions are managed by Alberta Environment and Parks.

Communities

The following municipalities are contained in the Upper Athabasca Region.

 

Towns
 Athabasca
 Barrhead
 Edson
 High Prairie
 Hinton
 Mayerthorpe
 Onoway
 Slave Lake
 Swan Hills
 Westlock
 Whitecourt

Villages
 Alberta Beach
 Boyle
 Clyde

Summer villages
 Birch Cove
 Bondiss
 Castle Island
 Island Lake
 Island Lake South
 Larkspur
 Mewatha Beach
 Nakamun Park
 Ross Haven
 Sandy Beach
 Silver Sands
 South Baptiste
 South View
 Sunrise Beach
 Sunset Beach
 Sunset Point
 Val Quentin
 West Baptiste
 West Cove
 Whispering Hills
 Yellowstone

Métis settlements
 East Prairie
 Peavine
 Gift Lake

Municipal districts
 Athabasca County
 County of Barrhead No. 11
 Big Lakes County
 Lac Ste. Anne County
 Municipal District of Lesser Slave River No. 124
 Westlock County
 Woodlands County
 Yellowhead County

Specialized municipalities
 Jasper

Improvement districts
 Improvement District No. 12

Indian reserves
 Alexis 133
 Alexis Cardinal River 234
 Alexis Elk River 233
 Alexis Whitecourt 232
 Assineau River 150F
 Driftpile River 150
 Kapawe'no 150B
 Kapawe'no 150C
 Kapawe'no 150D
 Kapawe'no 229
 Kapawe'no 230
 Kapawe'no 231
 Sawridge 150G
 Sawridge 150H
 Enoch Cree Nation 135A
 Sucker Creek 150A
 Swan River 150E

References

Alberta land-use framework regions